Christians form 1.3% of the total population numbering around 3.5 lakhs in Punjab, India as per as 2011 census. But according to many observers, demographic experts and Christian groups, there may be as many 1.94-2.77 million Christians living in Punjab, constituting up to (7%-10%) of the state population, but the authenticity of that claim is still not known. Hinduism, Islam, and Sikhism are the other religions in the state. John Lowrie and William Reed were missionaries  who went there in 1834. The Diocese of Amritsar of the Church of North India has its seat in Punjab as does the Roman Catholic diocese of Jalandhar. There are thousands of settlements with a Christian congregation. From 1881 to 1891 the Christian population of the then still united Punjab increased rapidly.

Denominations: United Churches of North India (UCNI), Protestant Church, Methodist Church, Presbyterian Church, Roman Catholic Church, Eternal Light Ministries, Kashmir Evangelical Fellowship, the Pentecostal Mission, Pentecostal and Independent Churches.

History 
The Christians of colonial India were active in the Indian National Congress and wider Indian independence movement, being collectively represented in the All India Conference of Indian Christians, which advocated for swaraj and opposed the partition of India.

The meeting of the All India Conference of Indian Christians in Lahore in December 1922, which had a large attendance of Punjabis, resolved that the clergymen of the Church in India should be drawn from the ranks of Indians, rather than foreigners. The AICIC also stated that Indian Christians would not tolerate any discrimination based on race or skin colour.

S. K. Datta of Lahore, who served as the principal of Forman Christian College, became the president of the All India Conference of Indian Christians, representing the Indian Christian community at the Second Round Table Conference, where he agreed with Mahatma Gandhi's views on minorities and Depressed Classes.

On 30 October 1945, the All India Conference of Indian Christians formed a joint committee with the Catholic Union of India that passed a resolution in which, "in the future constitution of India, the profession, practice and propagation of religion should be guaranteed and that a change of religion should not involve any civil or political disability." This joint committee enabled the Christians in colonial India to stand united, and in front of the British Parliamentary Delegation "the committee members unanimously supported the move for independence and expressed complete confidence in the future of the community in India." The office for this joint committee was opened in Delhi, in which the Vice-Chancellor of Andhra University M. Rahnasamy served as President and B.L. Rallia Ram of Lahore served as General Secretary. Six members of the joint committee were elected to the Minorities Committee of the Constituent Assembly. In its meeting on 16 April 1947 and 17 April 1947, the joint committee of the All India Conference of Indian Christians and Catholic Union of India prepared a 13 point memorandum that was sent to the Constituent Assembly of India, which asked for religious freedom for both organisations and individuals; this came to be reflected in the Constitution of India.

On 31 August 2022, the Sikh leader of the Akal Takht alleged that Christian missionaries are forcibly converting people of the state and demanded an anti-conversion law be brought up into the books. On the same day, a pastor's car was lit on fire in Thakarpur village of Tarn Taran district.

Demographics

Percentage by district

See also 

 Punjabi Christians
 Christianity in Punjab, Pakistan

References

 
Religion in Punjab, India
Social groups of Punjab, India